The Orlovka is a river in Tomsk Oblast with its origins in Krasnoyarsk Krai in Russia, a right tributary of the Ket (Ob basin). The Orlovka originates from Lake Burgunku and flows over the West Siberian Plain. It freezes up in mid-October or early November and remains icebound until late April or May.

References

Rivers of Krasnoyarsk Krai
Rivers of Tomsk Oblast